James Deane may refer to:

James Deane (drift driver), Irish professional drift driver
Jim Deane, Australian rules footballer
Jimmy Deane, British Communist
James Parker Deane (1812–1902), English judge

See also
James Dean (disambiguation)